Shelton DeAndre Gibson (born March 20, 1995) is an American football wide receiver who is a free agent. He played college football at West Virginia and was drafted by the Philadelphia Eagles in the fifth round of the 2017 NFL Draft.

Early years
Gibson attended Cleveland Heights High School in Cleveland Heights, Ohio. He committed to West Virginia University to play college football.

College career
Gibson played at West Virginia from 2013 to 2016. After his junior year, he entered the 2017 NFL Draft. He finished his career with 84 receptions for 1,898 yards and 17 touchdowns.

Professional career

Philadelphia Eagles
Gibson was drafted by the Philadelphia Eagles in the fifth round, 166th overall, in the 2017 NFL Draft. He finished his rookie year with 11 receiving yards. The Eagles finished with a 13–3 record, clinching the NFC East division, and eventually made it to Super Bowl LII, where they would win their first Super Bowl after defeating the New England Patriots, 41–33.

In the 2018 season opener against the Atlanta Falcons, Gibson handled some kick return duties for the first time in his professional career. In the 18–12 victory, he had two kick returns for 43 net yards. He was waived/injured on August 12, 2019, and was subsequently placed on injured reserve after clearing waivers on August 13. He was waived from injured reserve with an injury settlement on August 21.

Cleveland Browns
Gibson was signed to the Cleveland Browns' practice squad on September 1, 2019.

Philadelphia Eagles (second stint)
Gibson was signed off of the Browns' practice squad to the Philadelphia Eagles' active roster on January 1, 2020 ahead of the Eagles' wild card playoff match up against the Seattle Seahawks. He was targeted once, drawing a pass interference penalty. He was waived on July 26, 2020.

Washington Football Team
Gibson was signed to the practice squad of the Washington Football Team on September 7, 2020. He was released on September 17.

Carolina Panthers
Gibson signed to the Carolina Panthers' practice squad on November 2, 2020. He was released on November 20. He was re-signed to the practice squad on December 4, and released again on December 14.

BC Lions
Gibson signed with the BC Lions of the Canadian Football League for the 2022 season.

References

External links
 West Virginia Mountaineers bio

1995 births
Living people
Players of American football from Cleveland
American football wide receivers
American football return specialists
West Virginia Mountaineers football players
Philadelphia Eagles players
Cleveland Browns players
Washington Football Team players
Carolina Panthers players
Cleveland Heights High School alumni